Sourav Chakraborty (born October 11, 1988) is an Indian actor, director, writer and producer. He has started his career with the Bengali television series Bodhu Kon Alo Laaglo Chokhe. He got fame for his character as Sourav Mitra from Bodhu Kon Alo Laaglo Chokhe. Besides acting, Chakraborty has great interest in poetry and direction. He made his directorial debut through Bengali web series Cartoon.  His other notable works are- "Japani Toy", "Murder in The Hills", "Paanch Phoron", "Jotugriha", "Dhanbad Blues", "Lift". His web series "Shobdo Jobdo" got Brand Equity SPOTT Awards for Best Regional Web Series. From 2020, Sourav Chakraborty started his new journey with Uribaba which claims to be the first independent Bengali platform of free content for online viewers. Uribaba has become due to Sourav's influence as one of the most popular platforms for new aspiring artists to show case their talents.

Career
He has started his career with the Bengali television series Bodhu Kon Alo Laaglo Chokhe. He got fame for his character as Sourav Mitra from Bodhu Kon Alo Laaglo Chokhe. Besides acting, Chakraborty has great interest in poetry and direction. He made his directorial debut through Bengali web series Cartoon.  His other notable works are- "Japani Toy", "Murder in The Hills", "Paanch Phoron", "Jotugriha", "Dhanbad Blues", "Lift". His web series "Shobdo Jobdo" got Brand Equity SPOTT Awards for Best Regional Web Series. He also acted in Charitraheen Season 2 and his role was highly appreciated by many.

Filmography

Television

Web Series

Movies

Direction

References

External links 
 

Living people
Year of birth missing (living people)